The West Indies women's cricket team toured England to play the England women's cricket team in June 2019. The tour consisted of three Women's One Day Internationals (WODIs) and three Women's Twenty20 Internationals (WT20Is). The WODI games were part of the 2017–20 ICC Women's Championship. Prior to their visit to England, the West Indies women's team also toured Ireland to play three WT20I matches. England women won the WODI series 3–0. With the victory in the third WODI, it was England's 13th-consecutive win across all formats. England won the T20I series 1–0, after two matches were abandoned due to rain.

Squads

Reniece Boyce, Shanika Bruce, Britney Cooper, Shabika Gajnabi, Sheneta Grimmond and Shawnisha Hector were also named as reserve players for the West Indies. Ahead of the tour, Deandra Dottin was ruled out of the West Indies' squad due to injury, and was replaced by Britney Cooper. Bryony Smith was added to England's squad for the third WODI match of the series.

WODI series

1st WODI

2nd WODI

3rd WODI

WT20I series

1st WT20I

2nd WT20I

3rd WT20I

References

External links
Series home at ESPN Cricinfo

Women's cricket tours of England
2017–20 ICC Women's Championship
2019 in West Indian cricket
2019 in English cricket
International cricket competitions in 2019
England 2019
cricket
2019 in women's cricket